Dogborn is a 2022 Swedish thriller film written and directed by Isabella Carbonell, in her directorial debut.

The film premiered in the International Critics' Week section of the 79th edition of the Venice Film Festival. It marked the acting debut of rapper Silvana Imam.

Plot

Cast 
   Silvana Imam as Systern 
     Philip Oros  as Brodern 
     Emma Lu  as Yubi 
     Mia Liu  as Mai 
     Henrik Norlén  as Yann 
     Hannes Meidal  as Kjell 
     Rikard Svensson  as Simon

References

External links
 

2022 thriller films
Swedish thriller films
2022 directorial debut films